Rodrigo Odriozola López (born 31 August 1988 in Durazno), is a Uruguayan professional footballer who plays for Racing Club de Montevideo as a goalkeeper.

Club career
Odriozola started his senior career with Montevideo Wanderers. He signed with Iranian club Gostaresh Foolad in August 2014. He was released by the club in December 2014. In 2015, signed with Deportivo Pasto.

References

Living people
1988 births
Uruguayan footballers
Uruguayan expatriate footballers
Uruguayan Primera División players
Uruguayan Segunda División players
Categoría Primera A players
Primera B de Chile players
Persian Gulf Pro League players
Montevideo Wanderers F.C. players
Racing Club de Montevideo players
C.A. Cerro players
Gostaresh Foulad F.C. players
Deportivo Pasto footballers
C.A. Progreso players
Rampla Juniors players
Ñublense footballers
Uruguayan expatriate sportspeople in Colombia
Uruguayan expatriate sportspeople in Iran
Uruguayan expatriate sportspeople in Chile
Expatriate footballers in Colombia
Expatriate footballers in Iran
Expatriate footballers in Chile
Association football goalkeepers